The Wyfold Challenge Cup is a rowing event for men's coxless fours at the annual Henley Royal Regatta on the River Thames at Henley-on-Thames in England.  It is open to male crews from a single rowing club. Boat clubs from any university, college or secondary school are not permitted.

The trophy was presented in 1847 by George David Donkin, and named after his home, Wyfold Court.  It was originally awarded to the winner of the trial heats for the Grand, but in 1855 it became a new event for fours.

Winners

References

Events at Henley Royal Regatta
Rowing trophies and awards